Mat is region in north-central Albania. It takes its name from the Mat River located in the region. The inhabitants are mostly Muslim, traditionally composed of six bajraks: Burrel, Klos, Lis, Lukan, Prell and Xibër.

According to a 1918 census carried out by the Austro-Hungarians, Mat at the time consisted of 3,986 households and 23,643 total individuals.

Etymology
The river name was written in Latin as "Mathis" by the 4th/5th century writer Vibius Sequester and before that in Ancient Greek as "Mάτη" (Máti). The name is also seen as:
 "Mathia" in 1308 in the Anonymi Descriptio Europae Orientalis;
 "Mat" in 1488 in an Ottoman tax document;
 "Matia" in 1515 in the Breve memoria of Gjon Muzaka; 
 "Machia" on the 1554 Mercator map;
 "Mattia" in the 1570 anonymous Relazione dell'Albania;
 "Emathia" in 1596 in Jaques De Lavardin's Historie of George Castriot;
 "Mathia" in 1610 in the report of Marino Bizzi;
 "Matthia" in 1614 in the report of the Venetian writer Mariano Bolizza; 
 "Ematia" in 1621 in a letter of Pjetër Budi;
 "Man", a misspelling or misreading for "Mat", in 1662 in the Seyahatnâme of Evliya Çelebi;
 "Emathia" in the 1671 report by Piero Stefano Gaspari;
 "Mathia" in about 1685 in the report of Giorgio Stampaneo; 
 "Matis" in 1821 on the map of French consul Hugues Pouqueville; and 
 "Máthis" in 1848 in the journal of Edward Lear.

History 
Mati and Dibra aren't tribes in the sense of a fis, with  blood ties and a common history and single male ancestor, but the region has a strong collective identity nonetheless, and formed its own military unit in war (bajrak). The basin of the Mat River consists of rolling hills surrounded by mountains that have long protected the inhabitants. Because it was so isolated, the German historian Georg Stadtmüller (1901–85) postulated that the Albanian people could be traced to this specific region. Mat has been inhabited since at least the Bronze Age, but no urban areas had developed there until the modest town of Burrel in the mid-20th century.

The Mat region is inhabited by four different clans headed by one or more families, each a primus inter pares in the region: the Bozhiqi in the upper valley, the Çelaj to the south, the Olomani or Alamani, and the Zogolli in the north.

In the 20th century Mat was the home of Ahmet bey Zogolli (1895–1961), also known as Ahmet Zogu, who ruled  Albania 1924–1939, mostly as King Zog. He had become head of the Zogolli when his father, Xhemal Pasha Zogolli (1860–1911) died.

References 

Albania articles missing geocoordinate data
Regions of Albania